Rudňany is a village and municipality in the Spišská Nová Ves District in the Košice Region of central-eastern Slovakia.

History
In historical records the village was first mentioned in 1255.
By the 13th century, silver, copper and mercury were mined in the area. Around 1895, an iron ore smelting company Vitkovické ironworks, was founded and following the end of the 2nd World War it became the largest of its kind in Slovakia.

Geography
The village lies at an altitude of 547 metres and covers an area of 13.63 km2.
In 2011 had a population of 3807 inhabitants.

References

External links
http://www.statistics.sk/mosmis/eng/run.html
http://www.iarelative.com/koterba.htm
http://en.e-obce.sk/obec/rudnany/rudnany.html
http://www.rudnany.ocu.sk

Villages and municipalities in Spišská Nová Ves District